Kapasan is a city and a municipality in Chittaurgarh district in the Indian state of Rajasthan.

Demographics
Kapasan has a municipal board. It is a constituency of Rajasthan Legislative assembly.
 India census, Kapasan had a population of 18,705. Males constitute 51% of the population and females 49%. Kapasan has an average literacy rate of 63%, higher than the national average of 59.5%: male literacy is 75%, and female literacy is 51%. In Kapasan, 15% of the population is under 6 years of age. It is now also known as an industrial town. Kapasan is famous for the great shrine of Deewana Shah which is considered to be the second most famous shrine after Ajmer's Khwaza Moinuddin Chishti Dargah in Rajasthan.

The town is located on Chittorgarh- Udaipur Section of NW Railway. It is falling in Chaittaurgarh district and a constituency of Rajastahn Legislative Assembly.  The town is well connected by road and is 40 km from Chattaurgarh and 78 km from Udaipur.  It has a famous Ramdwara of Ram Snehi Sampraday.

References

Cities and towns in Chittorgarh district